The  was an electric multiple unit (EMU) train type operated by the private railway operator Seibu Railway on commuter services in the Tokyo area of Japan from 1982 until 2014.

Design
Nine 8-car sets (72 vehicles) were built between 1982 and 1987, intended for use on all-stations "Local" services on the Seibu Ikebukuro Line. The trains combined 20 m long steel bodies with three pairs of sliding doors per side, based on the New 101 series design with similar underframes as the 2000 series trains. The trains were originally painted in the same livery applied to the 101 and 301 series trains, consisting of "lemon yellow" with a "warm grey" band around the windows, and unpainted stainless steel doors, but by 1999, the fleet was repainted in all-over yellow. The trains were air-conditioned from new.

Fleet
By 2014, the fleet consisted of two 8-car sets, based at Kotesashi and Minami-Iriso depots for use on Seibu Ikebukuro Line and Seibu Shinjuku Line workings respectively, and two 6-car sets based at Minami-Iriso. These sets were withdrawn from service by December 2014.

Formations

8-car sets
The eight-car sets were formed as shown below with six motored ("M") cars and two non-powered trailer ("T") cars.

 Cars 2, 4, and 6 were each equipped with two lozenge-type pantographs.
 Car 2 was designated as a mildly air-conditioned car.

6-car sets

The six-car sets were formed as shown below with four motored ("M") cars and two non-powered trailer ("T") cars.

 Cars 2 and 4 were each equipped with two lozenge-type pantographs.
 Car 2 was designated as a mildly air-conditioned car.

Interior

Seating consisted of longitudinal bench seating throughout. Priority seats were provided at the end of each car.

History
In 2010, sets 3005 and 3007 were reduced from eight to six cars, and the surplus cars scrapped. In December 2014, set 3009 was also reduced from eight to six cars.

The last two remaining sets, eight-car sets 3009 and 3011, were withdrawn from service in December 2014.

Livery variations
Ikebukuro Line set 3011 was repainted in a Galaxy Express 999 livery from May 2009, and set 3015 was repainted in a Saitama Seibu Lions baseball team livery from July 2010 and branded "L-train".

Resale
Six-car set 3007 and six cars of former eight-car set 3009 were transferred to the Ohmi Railway in Shiga Prefecture following their withdrawal in November and December 2014, respectively.

References

External links

 Seibu 3000 series train information 

Electric multiple units of Japan
3000 series
Train-related introductions in 1982
1500 V DC multiple units of Japan
Tokyu Car multiple units